Tyler Andrew Freeman (born May 21, 1999) is an American professional baseball shortstop for the Cleveland Guardians of Major League Baseball (MLB).

Amateur career
Freeman attended Etiwanda High School in Etiwanda, California. As a senior in 2017, he hit .526 with four home runs, 36 runs batted in, and 18 stolen bases.

Professional career
Freeman was selected by the Cleveland Indians in the second round of the 2017 Major League Baseball draft. He signed with the Indians, forgoing his commitment to play college baseball at Texas Christian University.

Freeman made his professional debut with the Arizona League Indians, batting .297 in 36 games. He played the 2018 season with the Mahoning Valley Scrappers, slashing .352/.405/.511 with two home runs, 38 runs batted in, and 14 stolen bases in 72 games, earning New York-Penn League All-Star honors. He started 2019 with the Lake County Captains, with whom he was named a Midwest League All-Star, before being promoted to the Lynchburg Hillcats in June. Over 123 games between both teams, Freeman batted .306/.368/.410 with three home runs, 44 runs batted in, and 19 stolen bases.

Freeman did not play a minor league game in 2020 due to the cancellation of the minor league season caused by the COVID-19 pandemic. In 2021, Freeman hit .323/.372/.470 in 41 games for the Double-A Akron RubberDucks. On August 9, 2021, Freeman underwent season-ending surgery on his left shoulder.

The newly named Cleveland Guardians selected Freeman to their 40-man roster on November 19, 2021.

The Guardians recalled Freeman from the minor leagues on August 3, 2022. He made his major league debut that same day, starting at third base.

References

External links

1999 births
Living people
Akron RubberDucks players
Arizona League Indians players
Baseball players from California
Cleveland Guardians players
Columbus Clippers players
Mahoning Valley Scrappers players
Major League Baseball infielders
Lake County Captains players
Lynchburg Hillcats players
People from Rancho Cucamonga, California